Kamal Choudhary (born 1989) is an Indian American physicist and computational materials scientist in the thermodynamics and kinetics group at the National Institute of Standards and Technology. He is most notable for establishing the NIST-JARVIS infrastructure for data-driven materials design and Materials informatics. He is also an associate editor of the journals npj Computational Materials and Scientific Data.

Career 
In 2015 Choudhary joined the Material Measurement laboratory at National Institute of Standards and Technology. He was awarded NIST accolade award in the field of data computing and data sharing for materials design in 2017. He was a speaker at the 2022 Massachusetts Institute of Technology's GraphEx symposium and Lawrence Berkeley National Lab's symposium. His research was highlighted by Texas Advanced Computing Center.

Prior to his tenure at NIST he was a graduate student researcher at the University of Florida in Susan Sinnott's computational materials science lab. He is also the founder and CEO of a small start-up company, DeepMaterials, which is focused on providing materials informatics and advanced computing solutions. 

Choudhary's research involves the development and application of computational methods using classical mechanics, quantum mechanics and artificial intelligence techniques to understand the electronic and atomic structure of materials. In particular, he has developed the NIST-JARVIS infrastructure. His research topics include condensed matter physics, density functional theory, force field, graph neural network and quantum computation algorithm development. His research work has led to computational discovery of several classes of materials including: Single-layer materials, Solar cell, Topological insulator, Superconductors, Thermoelectrics and Dielectrics.

References

External links 

 

Year of birth missing (living people)
Living people
University of Florida alumni